Potanga is a village in Boliyohuto district, Gorontalo Regency, Gorontalo Province, Indonesia.

References

Populated places in Gorontalo (province)